The Free Baptist Union was a Swedish Baptist denomination that began in 1872, when Baptist preacher  was expelled from the Baptist Union of Sweden, after having been accused of heresy.

The Free Baptist Union gained followers mainly in Scania, Gotland, Dalarna, Västmanland and Västergötland. In the early 1900s, the denomination peaked at around 5000 members.

References 

Baptist denominations in Europe
Protestantism in Sweden
Christian denominations in Sweden